Sujiva is a Malaysian Buddhist monk (samanera) and teacher of Vipassanā meditation in the Theravāda Buddhist tradition. Sujiva teaches Vipassanā meditation in the Western countries. He has written many books on vipassana and Metta meditation. He has also published several collections of poems.

Brief Biography
He was born in a big family in Kuala Lumpur, the capital of Malaysia. He ordained as a samanera shortly after his graduation from the prestigious University of Malaya in 1975. During his monastic training he practised under several masters in Malaysia, Thailand and Burma (Myanmar), including the Venerable Sayadaw U Pandita in the famed meditation center Sasana Yeiktha in Yangon. In 1984 he set up Santisukharama, a meditation center in a rubber tree plantation in Kota Tinggi on the southern tip of peninsular Malaysia. He has held countless retreats at the center and throughout the country. Since 1995 he has started conducting vipassana retreats in the West - Australia, New Zealand, Hong Kong, several countries of Europe, United States and Brazil.

Since September 2006, he’s been living more permanently in Europe where he follows groups of yogis in different countries and conducts Vipassana and Metta retreats, as well as seminars on the study of the Abhidhamma.

Publications

External links

Archive of mp3 for download
;mp3 download English-Italian
Brief Biography
Brief Biography

Theravada Buddhist monks
Malaysian Theravada Buddhists
Malaysian Buddhist monks
Theravada Buddhist spiritual teachers
Living people
1951 births
Malaysian people of Chinese descent